The 2011 Penn Quakers football team represented the University of Pennsylvania in the 2011 NCAA Division I FCS football season. The Quakers were led by 20th-year head coach Al Bagnoli and played their home games at Franklin Field. They were a member of the Ivy League. They finished the season 5–5 overall 4–3 in Ivy League play to tie for second place. Penn averaged 10,321 fans per game.

Schedule

Roster

References

Penn
Penn Quakers football seasons
Penn Quakers football